Mark Keller Dixon (born November 26, 1970) is a former American college and professional football player who was an offensive guard in the National Football League (NFL) for five seasons during the late 1990s and early 2000s.  He played college football for the University of Virginia, and received All-American honors.  He began his professional career playing in NFL Europe, then earned starting positions with the Baltimore Stallions and Montreal Alouettes of the Canadian Football League (CFL), and the Miami Dolphins of the NFL.

Early years
Dixon was born in Charlottesville, Virginia.  He attended Lucy C. Ragsdale High School in Jamestown, North Carolina, where he was a star high school football and basketball player for the Ragsdale Flying Tigers.

College career
Dixon accepted an athletic scholarship to attend the University of Virginia, and played for coach George Welsh's Virginia Cavaliers football team from 1990 to 1993.  As a senior offensive lineman for the Cavaliers in 1993, he was recognized for his achievements and under
consensus first-team All-American.

Professional career
Because of a series of injuries and related surgeries, Dixon was not selected in the 1994 NFL Draft. He was signed by the NFL's Philadelphia Eagles as an undrafted free agent, but was released by the Eagles before the start of the 1994 season. Attracted to the "best player plays" philosophy of Miami Dolphins head coach Jimmy Johnson, he signed with the Dolphins as a 27-year-old NFL rookie. Dixon earned a starting position on the Dolphins' offensive line, and played in 62 regular season games for the Dolphins, and started in 60 of them.

Post-playing career
Dixon is the former head coach of the Galax Maroon Tide football team of Galax High School in Galax, Virginia. In 2015, Dixon coached Galax to their first-ever state championship in football.
In 2017 Dixon resigned from Galax as head coach to pursue other opportunities. He then returned the next month to coach the Maroon Tide again.  Dixon resigned from Galax again in 2020 and took the head coaching job at Pulaski County High School (Virginia) in Dublin

References

1970 births
Living people
All-American college football players
American football offensive tackles
Baltimore Stallions players
Frankfurt Galaxy players
Miami Dolphins players
Montreal Alouettes players
Virginia Cavaliers football players